The Official Monetary and Financial Institutions Forum (OMFIF) is an independent think tank organization concerned with central banking, economic policy, and public investment.

OMFIF was co-founded in 2010 by David Marsh, who has subsequently served as its Chairman. John Orchard is OMFIF's CEO and Meghnad Desai, Baron Desai is Chairman of the OMFIF Advisory Board. Michael Lafferty is a former co-chairman of OMFIF.

OMFIF has offices in London, England, and Singapore.

References

External links
 OMFIF website
 

2010 establishments in England
2010 establishments in Singapore
Think tanks established in 2010
Political and economic think tanks based in the United Kingdom
Political and economic think tanks based in Singapore
Think tanks based in the United Kingdom
Think tanks based in Singapore
Economic research institutes
Organisations based in London
Economic policy